Lyddia Cheah Li Ya (born 8 September 1989, also known as Lyddia Cheah Yi Yu) is a Malaysian badminton player. Her younger sister, Soniia Cheah Su Ya is also a badminton player. In 2010, she competed at the Commonwealth Games in India.

Career 
In 2008, she became the runner-up at the Chinese Taipei Grand Prix Gold tournament. She was defeated by Saina Nehwal of India in the final. In 2009, she won a bronze medal at the Southeast Asian Games in the women's singles event. She was a part of the Malaysian team squad that won team gold at the 2009 Southeast Asian Games in the women's team event and 2010 Commonwealth Games in the mixed team event.

In 2012, she won the Maybank Malaysia International Challenge tournament. She lived up to expectations when she easily overpowered Singaporean seventh seed Liang Xiaoyu. By the end of July 2013 she announced her retirement from the international badminton scene and the National badminton team of Malaysia to pursue her A-level studies. As an independent player she joined the AirAsia Badminton Academy in 2014 and resumed her international career. In August 2015 she signed with team Derby in the United Kingdom to participate in England's National Badminton League. In 2016, she was the runner-up at the Bulgarian International tournament in the women's singles and doubles event. In 2017, she won the Iceland International tournament in the women's doubles event, and became the runner-up in the singles event.

Achievements

Southeast Asian Games 
Women's singles

Asian Junior Championships 
Girls' singles

Girls' doubles

BWF Grand Prix 
The BWF Grand Prix had two levels, the Grand Prix and Grand Prix Gold. It was a series of badminton tournaments sanctioned by the Badminton World Federation (BWF) and played between 2007 and 2017.

Women's singles

  BWF Grand Prix Gold tournament
  BWF Grand Prix tournament

BWF International Challenge/Series 
Women's singles

Women's doubles

  BWF International Challenge tournament
  BWF International Series tournament
  BWF Future Series tournament

References

External links 
 

1989 births
Living people
Sportspeople from Kuala Lumpur
Malaysian sportspeople of Chinese descent
Malaysian female badminton players
Badminton players at the 2010 Asian Games
Asian Games competitors for Malaysia
Badminton players at the 2010 Commonwealth Games
Commonwealth Games gold medallists for Malaysia
Commonwealth Games medallists in badminton
Competitors at the 2007 Southeast Asian Games
Competitors at the 2009 Southeast Asian Games
Competitors at the 2011 Southeast Asian Games
Southeast Asian Games gold medalists for Malaysia
Southeast Asian Games bronze medalists for Malaysia
Southeast Asian Games medalists in badminton
Universiade bronze medalists for Malaysia
Universiade medalists in badminton
Medallists at the 2010 Commonwealth Games